Kualoa Regional Park is located at Kāneʻohe Bay, on the island of Oahu in the U.S. state of Hawaii. The beach front is white sand and 1/3 mile offshore is the small basalt island of Mokoliʻi (or Chinaman's Hat).

The site is popular with watchers of wetland birds, such as the Japanese white-eye, Red-crested cardinal, White-rumped shama, Black-crowned night heron, Black-necked stilt, Nutmeg mannikin, Black noddy, Wedge-tailed shearwater, White-tailed tropicbird, Red-tailed tropicbird, Common myna, Common waxbill, Cattle egret and a variety of others.

Hours of operation, facilities
The park is open seven days a week:
Sunday – Saturday 7:00 a.m. – 8:00 p.m

Public restrooms, and camping area with showers are provided.

References

Beaches of Oahu
Geography of Honolulu County, Hawaii
History of Oahu
Parks in Hawaii